Hosogai (written: 細貝) is a Japanese surname. Notable people with the surname include:

, Japanese footballer
, Japanese actor and musician

Japanese-language surnames